William Bly (15 May 1920 – 24 March 1982) was an English professional football goalkeeper who played in The Football League for Hull City. As of November 2016, he is fourth on Hull City's most league appearances list. Hull City and North Ferriby United contest the annual Billy Bly Memorial Trophy.

Bly was released by Hull City at the end of the 1959–60 season and received a benefit match in October 1961, in which he featured. He had been keeping fit at the Brunswick Institute before joining Weymouth part-way through the 1961–62 season. He made his debut against Wellington Town on 11 November and played for the club for the remainder of the season.

He then joined Hull Brunswick, who played in Division Two of the Yorkshire League, where he remained until his retirement. He thereafter joined the coaching staff.

References

English footballers
Walker Celtic F.C. players
Hull City A.F.C. players
Weymouth F.C. players
Hull Brunswick F.C. players
Dumbarton F.C. wartime guest players
English Football League players
1920 births
1982 deaths
Association football goalkeepers